A Kyiv cake  is a brand of dessert cake, made in Kyiv, Ukraine since December 6, 1956 by the Karl Marx Confectionery Factory (now a subsidiary of the Roshen corporation). It soon became popular all over the Soviet Union.

The cake has become one of the symbols of Kyiv, particularly by its brand name and package, depicting the horse chestnut leaf, the informal coat of arms of Kyiv.

The cake has two airy layers of meringue with hazelnuts, chocolate glaze, and a buttercream-like filling.

History 

Once confectioners forgot to put some amount of egg-white for the biscuit in a cooler. The next morning the chef Kostiantyn Petrenko, with the help of 17-year-old assistant Nadia Chornohor, in order to hide the mistake of his colleagues, spread frozen cakes with buttercream, strewed with powder, decorated with floral ornaments.

The recipe of the Kyiv cake has changed with time: in the 1970s, bakers perfected the process of making egg-white and nut mixture, then started to add hazelnut in cake and began experimenting with peanuts and cashews. However, these expensive nuts increased the cake's cost so the factory returned to using hazelnuts.

The Soviet Union in those years actively supported India. It paid with goods. Thus, in 1956, the USSR received a huge batch of cashew nuts. The party instructed the country's confectioners to create a dessert using these nuts. And the Kyiv factory named after Karl Marx coped with the task best of all. Here is what they say at the factory: "The author of the recipe and production technology of the Kyiv cake is Kostiantyn Petrenko. We had such a head of the biscuit shop, he once worked as a master. The recipe and technology were developed in 1956. The creation of the cake was preceded by experiments for several years with ancient, exquisite recipes, because nothing appears out of nowhere."

Preparation 
Nuts are fried, finely chopped and mixed with flour. Whip the egg whites, gradually adding the sugar and vanilla powder. Both mixtures are combined. The resulting dough is spread on paper in an even layer 0.6–0.7 cm thick and baked at 150–160 ° C. The baked cakes are dried for 12 hours at 25–30 ° C, then the paper is separated from them by moistening it with water.
The cakes are smeared with chocolate buttercream and put together. The sides are also coated with cream and crumbs are applied to them from the remnants of the cakes. The top is trimmed with colored buttercream (an image of a blooming chestnut) and decorated with fruits and candied fruits.

See also

 Dacquoise
 Pavlova
 Sans rival
 Spanische Windtorte

References

External links
Article in the KyivPost

Ukrainian pastries
Culture in Kyiv
Soviet cuisine
Ukrainian brands
Soviet brands
Cashew dishes
Brand name desserts
Layer cakes
Ukrainian cakes